In mathematics, an identity function, also called an identity relation, identity map or identity transformation, is a function that always returns the value that was used as its argument, unchanged.

Definition

In other words, the function value  in the codomain  is always the same as the input element  in the domain .

Algebraic properties
If  is any function, then we have  (where "∘" denotes function composition).

Such a definition generalizes to the concept of an identity morphism in category theory, where the endomorphisms of  need not be functions.

Properties
The identity function is a linear operator when applied to vector spaces.
In an -dimensional vector space the identity function is represented by the identity matrix , regardless of the basis chosen for the space.
The identity function on the positive integers is a completely multiplicative function (essentially multiplication by 1), considered in number theory. 
In a metric space the identity function is trivially an isometry. An object without any symmetry has as its symmetry group the trivial group containing only this isometry (symmetry type ).
In a topological space, the identity function is always continuous.
The identity function is idempotent.

See also
 Identity matrix
 Inclusion map

References

Functions and mappings
Elementary mathematics
Basic concepts in set theory
Types of functions
1 (number)